The Rua Augusta Arch (Portuguese: Arco da Rua Augusta) is a stone, memorial arch-like, historical building and visitor attraction in Lisbon, Portugal, on the Praça do Comércio. It was built to commemorate the city's reconstruction after the 1755 earthquake. It has six columns (some 11 m high) and is adorned with statues of various historical figures. Significant height from the arch crown to the cornice imparts an appearance of heaviness to the structure. The associated space is filled with the coat of arms of Portugal. The allegorical group at the top, made by French sculptor Célestin Anatole Calmels, represents Glory rewarding Valor and Genius.

Originally designed as a bell tower, the building was ultimately transformed into an elaborate arch after more than a century.

Features

Because of the top cornice's great height (over ), the figures above it had to be made colossal. The female allegory of Glory, which is dressed in peplos and measures , stands on a three-step throne and holds two crowns. Valor is personified by an amazon, partially covered with chlamys and wearing a high-crested helmet with dragon patterns, which were the symbols of the House of Braganza. her left hand holds the parazonium, with a trophy of flags behind. The Genius encompasses a statue of Jupiter behind his left arm. At his left side are the attributes of writing and arts.

The four statues over the columns, made by Victor Bastos, represent Nuno Alvares Pereira and Sebastião José de Carvalho e Melo, Marquis of Pombal on the right, and Vasco da Gama and Viriatus on the left. The two recumbent figures represent the rivers Tagus and Douro.

It appeared as the arch through which the Lilliputians wheeled Lemuel Gulliver in the 1996 miniseries Gulliver's Travels.

See also
 List of post-Roman triumphal arches

References

Buildings and structures completed in 1873
Monuments and memorials in Lisbon
Triumphal arches in Portugal
Tourist attractions in Lisbon